Pizzo Nero (2,904 m) is a mountain of the Lepontine Alps, located on the border between the Swiss cantons of Valais and Ticino. Its summit is the tripoint between the valleys of Geretal, Gonerli (upper Rhone) and Bedretto (upper Ticino).

References

External links
Pizzo Nero on Hikr

Lepontine Alps
Mountains of the Alps
Mountains of Valais
Mountains of Ticino
Ticino–Valais border
Mountains of Switzerland
Two-thousanders of Switzerland